Salix humilis, known as prairie willow, is a species of willow native to the United States and Canada, east of the Rockies.

It is a shrub, 2–12 feet tall, which often forms thickets. The stems are yellowish to brown. The gray-green to blue-green foliage has insignificant fall color.

Male and female flowers are found on separate plants. The green silky catkins appear before the leaves emerge in spring.

References

humilis
Flora of North America